The 2021–22 Western Michigan Broncos men's basketball team represented Western Michigan University in the 2021–22 NCAA Division I men's basketball season. The Broncos, led by second-year head coach Clayton Bates, played their home games at University Arena in Kalamazoo, Michigan as members of the Mid-American Conference. They finished the season 8–23, 4–16 in MAC play to finish in last place. They failed to qualify for the MAC tournament.

On March 7, 2022, head coach Clayton Bates resigned after only two seasons. On April 5, the school named longtime Michigan State assistant Dwayne Stephens the team's new head coach.

Previous season
In a season limited due to the ongoing COVID-19 pandemic, the Broncos finished the 2020–21 season 5–16, 4–12 in MAC play to finish in ninth place. As a result, they failed to qualify for the MAC tournament.

Offseason

Departures

Incoming Transfers
On April 28, 2021, the NCAA officially adopted a measure that would allow athletes in all sports to transfer once without sitting out a season beginning with the 2021–22 season.

Recruiting class

2021 recruiting class

Roster

Schedule and results
 
|-
!colspan=9 style=|Exhibition

|-
!colspan=9 style=|Non-conference regular season
|-

|-
!colspan=9 style=|MAC regular season
|-

|-

Sources

References

Western Michigan Broncos men's basketball seasons
Western Michigan Broncos
Western Michigan Broncos men's basketball
Western Michigan Broncos men's basketball